The 1900–01 Scottish Cup was the 28th season of Scotland's most prestigious football knockout competition. The cup was won by Heart of Midlothian when they beat holders Celtic 4–3 in the final at Ibrox Park (the same scoreline as in the previous season) to claim the trophy for a third time in their history.

Calendar

First round

First round replay

Second round

Match declared void as referee not present.
Match Abandoned

Second round replay

Quarter-final

Quarter-final replay

Quarter-final second replay

Quarter-final third replay

Semi-finals

Semi-final replay

Final

See also
1900–01 in Scottish football

References

RSSF Scottish Cup 00-01

Scottish Cup seasons
Cup
1900–01 domestic association football cups